In advertising, repetition variation is an advertising technique in which repeated ads contain slight variations in order to optimize their effectiveness and prevent advertising "wearout".

There are several forms of repetition variation: cosmetic variation, where non-substantive portions of the ad are altered and substantive variation, where there is a conspicuous change in the ad.

References

Advertising techniques